Lacuna Coil is the first EP by Italian gothic metal band Lacuna Coil, released on April 7, 1998, by Century Media.

Track listing

Credits 
 Cristina Scabbia - vocals
 Andrea Ferro - vocals
 Raffaele Zagaria - guitars
 Claudio Leo - guitars
 Marco Coti Zelati - bass
 Leonardo Forti - drums
 Waldemar Sorychta - keyboards, producer
 Media Logistics (Carsten Drescher) - Design and layout

References

Lacuna Coil albums
1998 debut EPs
Albums produced by Waldemar Sorychta